Tylodontia is a genus of flowering plants belonging to the family Apocynaceae.

Its native range is Cuba.

Species:
 Tylodontia cubensis Griseb. 
 Tylodontia fuscula (C.Wright) Mangelsdorff, Meve & Liede 
 Tylodontia stipitata Mangelsdorff, Meve & Liede 
 Tylodontia urceolata (Griseb.) Mangelsdorff, Meve & Liede

References

Apocynaceae
Apocynaceae genera